Sawan Singh (20 July 1858- 2 April 1948), also known as The Great Master or Bade Maharaj ji, was an Indian Saint or Sant. He was the second spiritual head of Radha Soami Satsang Beas (RSSB) from the death of Jaimal Singh in 1903 until his own death on 2 April 1948.

Before he died, he appointed Jagat Singh as his spiritual successor.

Honorifics
Although he did not refer to himself with these, the following appellations and honorifics have been used to refer to Sawan Singh:
Bade Maharaj Ji
Hazur Maharaj
Sawan Shah
The Great Master
Hazur Baba Sawan Singh Ji Maharaj

Life

Sawan Singh Grewal was born into a Grewal Jat Sikh family in his mother's home at the village of Jatana, District Ludhiana, in pre-partition Punjab. Sawan Singhs ancestral village was Mehma Singh Wala, District Ludhiana in Punjab. His father was Subedar Major Sardar Kabal Singh Grewal and his mother was Mata Jiwani Kaur. He was married to Mata Kishan Kaur and together they had three children. He passed engineering at Thomason College of Civil Engineering, Roorkee and later joined the Military Engineering Service.

He studied scriptures of various religions but retained a strong connection with the Gurbani of the Sikh religion.

He had contact with a mystic of Peshawar named Baba Kahan who he hoped to get initiation from but was refused:

"I associated with him for several months and during that time he showed supernatural powers on several occasions. When I asked him if he would shower grace upon me by initiating me, he answered: 'No, he is somebody else; I do not have your share'. I then asked him to tell me who that person was so that I could contact him. He replied: 'When the time comes, he will himself find you'."

Later when Sawan Singh was stationed at Murree, he met Jaimal Singh, who said to his companion that he had come to initiate Sawan Singh. After much philosophical debate, discussion and several conferences with  Jaimal Singh, Sawan Singh became thoroughly convinced and received initiation from Jaimal Singh into the practice of surat shabd yoga on the 15th day of October, 1894.

Sawan Singh retired on government pension in 1911 to Dera Baba Jaimal Singh (Beas), the "camp of Baba Jaimal Singh" where Jaimal Singh had settled in 1891. During his ministry the Dera expanded greatly, with houses for both permanent residents and guests, a library and a Satsang Hall. Sawan Singh sheltered victims of the communal holocaust of the Partition of India. His following included Hindus, Muslims, Sikhs, Christians, and for the first time, thousands from abroad. He had initiates from America, England, Switzerland, Germany, most notable of whom being the Americans physician-surgeon Dr. Julian Johnson and chiropractic-osteopath Dr. Randolph Stone and the Swiss physician-homeopath Dr. Pierre Schmidt.

Books
He wrote following books. 
 Tales of the Mystic East (English) 
 Spiritual Gems (English) 
 Philosophy of the Masters (English) (five volumes)
 My Submission (English) 
 Discourses on Sant Mat (English)
 The Dawn of Light (English)
 Shabd Ki Mahima Ke Shabd

See also
 Radha Soami
 Surat Shabd Yoga
 Shiv Dayal Singh
 Charan Singh
 Kirpal Singh

Further reading
Maharaj Charan Singh, Spiritual Heritage.
Baba Jaimal Singh, Spiritual Letters.
Kapur, Daryailāl, Call of the Great Master.
Kapur, Daryailāl, Heaven on Earth.
Kirpal Singh, A Brief Life Sketch of Hazur Baba Sawan Singh Ji Maharaj.
Moss, Cami, Glimpses of the Great Master.
Munshi Ram, With the three Masters.

Notes and references

External links

Radha Soami Satsang Beas (RSSB)
Science Of The Soul Research Centre

People from Ludhiana district
1858 births
1948 deaths
Radha Soami
Sant Mat gurus
Punjabi people
Indian Sikhs
Scholars from Punjab, India